The Zaña River (also Saña River) is a small river in northern Peru. In the lower part of the river valley, where the river flows through the coastal desert of Peru, the cultivation of irrigated crops is extensive and the Zaña is usually dry near its mouth. Upriver, at higher elevations in the Andes, precipitation is much greater and downstream floods are common. One such flood wiped out the important city of Zaña in 1720. Zaña has been rebuilt, but has never regained its former prominence as an urban center. Other towns in the lower valley are Mocupe, Cayalti, Nueva Arica, and Oyotun.

Vegetation
The semi-tropical forests found at elevations above  in the upper parts of the Zaña basin are an unusual feature of the river. The existence of the forests is due to the relatively low elevations of the Andes in this region between the desert coasts of western Peru and the rainforests of the Amazon Basin of the east. Plant and animal species characteristic of the Amazon are found here on the western slopes of the Andes. From the lands in the reserved zone, the Bosques Nublados de Udima Wildlife Refuge (Cloud Forests of Udima Wildlife Refuge) with an area of 12,183 hectares (30,100 acres) was created in 2011.

Archaeology
Numerous pre-Columbian ruins are scattered throughout the basin of the Zaña River. Near the Nanchoc river, a tributary of the Zaňa, archaeologist Tom Dillehay has found what may be the oldest irrigation canals in the Americas, radiocarbon dated to at least 3400 BCE and possibly as old as 4700 BCE.  The canals built by the people of Nanchoc at that time were utilized to irrigate crops such as peanuts, squash, manioc, and chenopods, a relative of Quinoa.

In 2019, Peruvian archaeologist Walter Alva discovered the ruins of a megalithic temple in the Zaña Valley near Oyotun. The temple is believed by Alva to be part of a larger complex.

References

Rivers of Peru
Rivers of Cajamarca Region
Geography of Cajamarca Region
Geography of Lambayeque Region